Myers Glacier is a valley glacier about  long, flowing southwest from Mount Noxon on Thurston Island to Abbot Ice Shelf in Peacock Sound. Delineated from aerial photographs taken by U.S. Navy Squadron VX-6 in January 1960. Named by Advisory Committee on Antarctic Names (US-ACAN) for Lieutenant (j.g.) Dale P. Myers, U.S. Navy, helicopter pilot aboard USS Burton Island who made exploratory flights to Thurston Island in February 1960.

See also
 List of glaciers in the Antarctic
 Glaciology

Maps
 Thurston Island – Jones Mountains. 1:500000 Antarctica Sketch Map. US Geological Survey, 1967.
 Antarctic Digital Database (ADD). Scale 1:250000 topographic map of Antarctica. Scientific Committee on Antarctic Research (SCAR), 1993–2016.

References
 

Glaciers of Thurston Island